The Rua Kēnana Pardon Act 2019 is a statute in the New Zealand Parliament that provides a pardon for the Tūhoe prophet Rua Kēnana (1869–1937).

The Act gives effect to an agreement between the Crown and Ngā Toenga o Ngā Tamariki a Iharaira me Ngā Uri o Maungapōhatu Charitable Trust signed on 9 September 2017, which was in turn based on the Waitangi Tribunal's 6 part WAI894 Te Urewera report.

The Act contains historical background, acknowledgements made by the Crown, an apology made by the crown, the pardon itself and the 'declaration that the character, mana, and reputation of Rua Kēnana, his uri, and Ngā Toenga o Ngā Tamariki o Iharaira Faith are restored.'

The text of the legislation is fully bilingual in English and Te reo Māori.

References

2019 in New Zealand law
Statutes of New Zealand
Pardon legislation